General Berry may refer to:

Hiram Gregory Berry (1824–1863), Union Army major general
Lucien Grant Berry (1863–1937), U.S. Army brigadier general
Sidney Bryan Berry (1926–2013), U.S. Army lieutenant general

See also
Albay Ahmed Berri (fl. 2010s), Free Syrian Army brigadier general